Sames is the capital of the parish of Mián, the municipality of Amieva, in the principality of Asturias, Spain.  The Iglesia de Santa María is about a kilometer from the town.  

Towns in Asturias